A cursory glance at the history of art reveals that social, political and economic conditions have always played a major role in the emergence of new artistic currents and styles. As an example Flight by Morteza Katouzian is showing the marginalized people who have no freedom as result of political changes. In Iran, the social and political developments of the 1940s radically altered the evolution of this country's plastic arts and entirely altering its natural path.

History 
The modern art movement in Iran had its genesis in the late 1940s and early 1950s. This was the period after the death of famous Persian painter, Kamal-ol-molk (1852–1940) and thus symbolically the end of a rigid adherence to academic painting.

The College of Fine Arts at Tehran University (now University of Tehran) served as an important place for students interested in modern art. The earliest College of Fine Arts students graduated in 1946, this group included Javad Hamidi, Shokouh Riazi, Jalil Ziapour, and Ahmad Esfandiari; all of which went on to continue their painting studies in Paris.

The 1949 opening of the Apadana gallery in Tehran by Mahmoud Javadipour and other colleagues, and the emergence of artists like Marcos Grigorian in the 1950s, signaled a commitment to the creation of a form of modern art grounded in Iran. Grigorian found influence for his art in popular Iranian culture, specifically a coffee-house storyteller culture and the visual language of dry earth and mud. 

One of Grigorian's students at the College of Fine Arts at Tehran University (now University of Tehran) was Hossein Zenderoudi, Zenderoudi was interested in the forms and aesthetics of objects made for Shi'a Islam worship. The scholar Karim Emami likened his art to the kind of objects found in saqqakhanas, coining term, the "Saqqakhaneh school".

Surrealism in Iran 
Aminollah Rezaei was the first to bring surrealist painting to Iran. For this reason, some consider him the father of surrealist painting in Iran. He had a special style in this school. Rezai's paintings range from surrealist and symbolic works to so-called black and thoughtful humorous cartoons. The political theme, and the anatomical form of a precise and elaborate species, the combination of human and animal limbs or the deformation of the body can be seen in his paintings. He was ruled but did not accept it. He also won an honorary diploma in handicrafts from Bangalore, India, from the Asian Cultural Exchange. His oil paintings have been exhibited in the Surrealists' Exhibition at the Persepolis Gallery at the Shiraz Art Festival.

Saqqakhaneh movement 
In the 1950 and 1960s, a new subgenre of Iranian art called the Saqqakhaneh school (also known as Saqqā-ḵāna, Saqqa-khaneh, Saqakhaneh, Sahakhanah) was pioneered by artists Hossein Zenderoudi, Parviz Tanavoli, Faramarz Pilaram, Massoud Arabshahi, Mansoor Ghandriz, Nasser Oveisi, Sadeq Tabrizi and Zhazeh Tabatabai. Artists associated with Saqqakhaneh successfully combined western art stylistic traditions and local symbols including calligraphy, zodiac signs, astrolabes, amulets and talismans in order to devise a distinctly local visual language. Religious motifs, such as the hand or a bowl, also featured prominently in Saqqakhaneh works.

Saqqakhaneh school is a movement of neo-traditional modern art that is found in Iran, rooted in a history of coffee-house paintings and Shiʿite Islam visual elements. The word Saqqakhaneh originally referred to a type of water-fountain shrine found locally, and came to represent a movement characterised heavily by symbolism.  Other motifs found throughout the region were incorporated into the artistic movement – the hand being a prime example.
In scholar Karim Emami's articles on “Saqqā-ḵāna Paintings,” he defined in which a, "combined religious imagery and traditional decorative elements with modern painting techniques, played a significant role in drawing the attention of the media and art connoisseurs to the genre". A visual language was created by drawing on the history of the Shi'a Islamic culture, specifically the saqqakhana, a small public area in which water is given to strangers often decorated with symbols and offerings. The artists of this genre were re-appropriating these symbolic traditions associated with the saqqakhana but with a modernist stance.

By the late 1960s into the 1970s he Saqqakhaneh school artists of Iran had international prominence and this helped pave the way for the opening of the Tehran Museum of Contemporary Art in 1977. The Tehran Museum of Contemporary Art boasting an important collection of both Western and Iranian artists. The Iranian revolution by 1979 halted the dynamics of the Iranian arts scene.

It has been debated by various scholars after the publication of Edward Said's 1978 book Orientalism (which posed similar questions), was the Saqqakhaneh movement affected by the postcolonial view of Iran or rather, did it intensify Orientalism.

In 2013, Layla S. Diba and Fereshteh Daftari co-curated the exhibition, Iran Modern (2013) shown at the Asia Society in New York City. The exhibition was the first major exhibition of modern art from Iran, featuring 26 artists which included Ahmad Aali, Abbas, Massoud Arabshahi, Siah Armajani, Mohammad Ehsai, Monir Shahroudy Farmanfarmaian, Mansour Ghandriz, Marcos Grigorian, Ghasem Hajizadeh, Nahid Hagigat, Bahman Jalali, Rana Javadi, Reza Mafi, Leyly Matine-Daftary, Ardeshir Mohassess, Bahman Mohassess, Nicky Nodjoumi, Houshang Pezeshknia, Faramarz Pilaram, Behjat Sadr, Abolghassem Saidi, Sohrab Sepehri, Parviz Tanavoli, Mohsen Vaziri-Moqaddam, Manoucher Yektai, and Hossein Zenderoudi. The exhibition was divided into sections including Saqqakhaneh and neotraditional art styles influenced by folk art history, abstract art, and calligraphy.

Saqqakhaneh artists’ fascination with signs and talismans has recently moved beyond avantgarde art and found its way into women’s fashion where its motifs are used in scarves, shawls, shirts and the like.

Naqqashikatt
Art movements, such as Saqqakhaneh, were significant precursors to the school of calligraphic painting. In Iran, the calligraphic art movement was known as Naqqashi-Katt (or Naqqashikatt). It was one of a number of art movements that emerged across the Middle East in the mid-20th century. Although these groups of artists emerged independently across North Africa and the Middle East,  the common thread was that each searched for ways to integrate tradition and modernity in a way that would contribute to a distinctive local visual language. Each of these groups went by a different labels at the local level. 

In Jordan, the movement emerged in the 1950s and was known as Hurufiyaa. while in Iraq, the movement was known as Al-Bu'd al-Wahad (One Dimension Group). The movement was known as the Old Khartoum School in Sudan, where artists rejected Western art traditions and focused on Islamic calligraphy, West African motifs and local traditions in the pursuit of indigenous compositions. In Sudan, the movement was known.

Notable artists in Iranian modern art

Early Iranian modern artists (1940s) 
Ahmad Esfandiari
Marcos Grigorian
Javad Hamidi
Shokouh Riazi
Mohsen Vaziri-Moghaddam
Jalil Ziapour

Fighting Cock Society artists (1950s)

Modern artists of the second wave (1950s–1960s) 

 Bahram Alivandi
 Mir Abdolrez Daryabeigi
 Monir Shahroudy Farmanfarmaian
 Mahmoud Farshchian
 Abbas Katouzian
 Leyly Matine-Daftary
 Behjat Sadr
 Manoucher Yektai
 Noureddin Zarrinkelk

Saqqakhaneh movement artists (1950s–1960s) 

 Massoud Arabshahi
 Mohammad Ehsai
 Mansoor Ghandriz
 Morteza Momayez
 Nasser Oveisi
 Faramarz Pilaram
 Sadeq Tabrizi
 Parviz Tanavoli
 Hossein Zenderoudi

Later modern artists (1970s to present-day) 
Abbas (photographer)
Reza Abedini, designer
Shirin Aliabadi
Ali Akbar Sadeghi
Aydin Aghdashloo
Kamrooz Aram
Siah Armajani
Morteza Avini
Jamal Bakhshpour
Shahin Charmi
Bijan Daneshmand
Reza Deghati
Shahram Entekhabi
Rokni Haerizadeh
Parastou Forouhar
Shadi Ghadirian
Behrouz Gharibpour, the Hans Christian Andersen Award (2002)
Kaveh Golestan
Barbad Golshiri
Gita Hashemi
Maryam Hashemi
Khosrow Hassanzadeh
Taraneh Hemami, fine artist
Shirazeh Houshiary, Turner Prize nominee
Pouran Jinchi
Y.Z. Kami
Iman Maleki
Sanaz Mazinani
Farhad Moshiri
Shirin Neshat, fine artist
Nicky Nodjoumi, fine artist
Mina Nouri painter, printmaker
Hossein Nuri painter, dramaturge, filmmaker
Eric Parnes
Mohammad Radvand
Jalil Rasouli
Jahangir Razmi, winner of the Pulitzer Prize
Bahram Kalhornia painter, graphist
Reza Khodadadi 
Mehdi Saeedi
Homayoun Salimi
Marjane Satrapi
Keyvan Shovir
Mitra Tabrizian
Sadegh Tirafkan
Alfred Yaghobzadeh

See also 
 Persian art
 Persian culture
 Intellectual Movements in Iran
 Iranian cinema
 List of Iranian artists
 List of Iranian painters
 List of Iranian women artists

References

External links 
 Iranian Academy of the Arts
 Iran makes bow at Madrid contemporary art fest
 Rice opens Iranian art show in US (BBC)
 Iranian Contemporary Art Consultancy
 Biggest Directory of Iranian Contemporary Artists

Modern and contemporary art
Modern art